Troy Daniel Reeder (born September 13, 1994) is an American football linebacker for the Los Angeles Chargers of the National Football League (NFL). He played college football at Penn State and Delaware.

Early life and high school
Reeder grew up in Hockessin, Delaware and attended Salesianum School, where he played football and lacrosse. In football, Reeder was named first team All-State (second straight season) at linebacker and the Delaware Defensive Player of the Year after making 96 tackles (60 solo) with 3.5 sacks, two forced fumbles and three fumbles recovered and first team All-State at running back after rushing for 1,154 yards and 18 touchdowns as the Sallies won the DIAA state championship. In lacrosse, Reeder was a three-time first team All-State selection and three time state champion. He originally committed to play the sport collegiately at North Carolina, but de-committed during his senior year as interest from football programs increased. Rated a four-star prospect by ESPN.com and a three-star recruit by Rivals, Scout, and 247Sports, Reeder committed to play college football at Penn State over offers from Miami, Vanderbilt, Virginia, Boston College, Rutgers, and Delaware.

College career
Reeder began his college career at Penn State, redshirting his freshman year. He became the starting middle linebacker for the Nittany Lions the following season after Nyeem Wartman-White suffered a season-ending injury in the season opener against Temple. He finished the season with 67 tackles (fourth-most on the team), including 5.5 for loss, and an interception in 12 games played (11 starts) and was named to the Big Ten Conference All-Freshman team. Shortly after the end of the season, Reeder announced he would be transferring to the University of Delaware.

Reeder immediately entered the Blue Hens starting lineup at outside linebacker and was named second team All-Colonial Athletic Association (CAA) after recording 63 tackles (4.5 for loss), one sack, two forced fumbles and one fumble recovery along with two interceptions, one of which he returned for a touchdown in his Delaware debut against Delaware State, and a blocked kick. He was named first team All-CAA as a redshirt junior after leading the team with 89 tackles (seven for loss), an interception, three pass breakups, a forced fumble, a fumble recovery and a blocked kick. In his final collegiate season, Reeder led the CAA with 131 tackles and 13.5 tackles for loss and was again named first team all-conference.

Professional career

Los Angeles Rams
Reeder signed with the Los Angeles Rams as an undrafted free agent on April 27, 2019, and made the team out of training camp. He made his NFL debut in the Rams season opener against the Carolina Panthers on September 8, 2019, making a tackle on special teams. Reeder made his first career start on October 3, 2019, against the Seattle Seahawks, replacing injured starter Bryce Hager and making a game-high 13 tackles. He started eight of the Rams last 12 games and finished his rookie season with 58 tackles and two forced fumbles.

In Week 5 of the 2020 season against the Washington Football Team, Reeder recorded 11 tackles and the first three sacks of his NFL career during the 30–10 win. He played in all 16 of the Rams' games with seven starts and finished the 2020 season as the team's second-leading tackler with 81 total tackles with five tackles for loss and three sacks.

Reeder helped the Rams reach Super Bowl LVI in the 2021 NFL season. Reeder recorded 2 tackles in the Super Bowl victory against the Cincinnati Bengals.

Los Angeles Chargers
On April 12, 2022, Reeder signed with the Los Angeles Chargers.

Personal life
Reeder is the son of former Delaware and Pittsburgh Steelers running back Dan Reeder. His mother Cheryl played basketball at Elizabethtown College and was a member of the 1982 team that won the Division III national championship. His younger brother Colby was also a standout two-way player at Salesianum and plays linebacker at Iowa State University after transferring from Delaware. Colby's commitment to play football at Delaware was a factor in Troy's decision to transfer there from Penn State.

References

External links
Penn State Nittany Lions bio
Los Angeles Rams bio
Delaware Blue Hens bio

1994 births
Living people
American football linebackers
People from Hockessin, Delaware
Los Angeles Chargers players
Los Angeles Rams players
Players of American football from Wilmington, Delaware
Penn State Nittany Lions football players
Delaware Fightin' Blue Hens football players
Salesianum School alumni